Kewaunee is a city in Kewaunee County, Wisconsin, United States.

Kewaunee may also refer to:

 Kewaunee County, Wisconsin
 Kewaunee River, Wisconsin

See also
 West Kewaunee, Wisconsin
 
 Kewanee (disambiguation)